Balzar may refer to:

People
 Andreas Balzar (1769–1797), German robber
 Fred B. Balzar (1880–1934), US-American politician, governor of Nevada
 Ilse Glaninger-Balzar (1919–1998), Austrian sculptress
 Robert Balzar (born 1962), Czech jazz musician

Places
 Balzar, Ecuador, town in Ecuador